Randy Griffin (born June 7, 1976) is a professional boxer. While best known as a middleweight, he began as a light heavyweight     and worked his way down  in weight class.  Griffin  unsuccessfully challenged for the WBA Middleweight title on October 20, 2007, managing a draw against defending champion Felix Sturm, but losing against him July 5, 2008.

As an amateur Griffin was the 1997  and 1999 Pennsylvania State Golden Gloves champion. He also competed in the 1998 Goodwill Games, in the 75 kg weight class, losing to  Jean-Paul Mendy of France in the quarterfinals.

References

Boxers from Philadelphia
Middleweight boxers
Living people
1976 births
American male boxers
Competitors at the 1998 Goodwill Games